Fred Yannick Uwase (born May 16, 1994 in Paris) is a Rwandan judoka. He competed in the men's 73 kg event at the 2012 Summer Olympics and was eliminated by Bruno Mendonca in the second round.

References

1994 births
Living people
Rwandan male judoka
Olympic judoka of Rwanda
Judoka at the 2012 Summer Olympics
Sportspeople from Paris